A Rumor of War is a 1980 television miniseries, based on the 1977 autobiography by Philip Caputo about his service in the United States Marine Corps in the early years of American involvement in the Vietnam War. It was one of the earliest serious US works of television or film drama to be based on US combat experience in Southeast Asia.

The miniseries was filmed at Camp Pendleton and Churubusco Studios, Mexico with a cast featuring Brad Davis, Keith Carradine, Brian Dennehy, Richard Bradford, Michael O'Keefe, Stacy Keach, Lane Smith and Christopher Mitchum.  The producers could not find enough Sikorsky HUS-1 helicopters so used UH-1 Huey helicopters instead.

External links

1980s American television miniseries
Films based on biographies
Vietnam War films
Films directed by Richard T. Heffron
Films about the United States Marine Corps
Films set in 1965
Films shot in Mexico